The Daurian starling (Agropsar sturninus), or purple-backed starling, is a species of bird in the starling family found in the eastern Palearctic from eastern Mongolia and southeastern Russia to North Korea and central China.

Taxonomy and systematics
The Daurian starling was previously placed in the genus Sturnus. It was moved to the resurrected genus Agropsar based on the results of two molecular phylogenetic studies that were published in 2008.

Description
The Daurian starling is distinguished from other starling species by its dark mantle and crown and narrow wing bars.

Distribution and habitat
The natural habitats of the Daurian starling are boreal forests and temperate forests.

References

BirdLife International 2004. Sturnus sturninus. 2006 IUCN Red List of Threatened Species. Downloaded on 24 July 2007.

Daurian starling
Birds of China
Birds of Korea
Birds of Manchuria
Daurian starling
Taxonomy articles created by Polbot